Yevgeni Yevgenyevich Kozlov (born 4 February 1995) is a Russian professional footballer who plays as a midfielder for Kazakh side Kyzylzhar.

Career
He made his debut in the Russian Second Division for FC Vityaz Podolsk on 16 July 2012 in a game against FC Fakel Voronezh.

He made his Russian Premier League debut for FC Volga Nizhny Novgorod on 15 May 2014 in a game against FC Ural Sverdlovsk Oblast.

References

External links
 
 
 

1995 births
People from Sergiyev Posad
Sportspeople from Moscow Oblast
Living people
Russian footballers
Russia under-21 international footballers
Association football midfielders
FC Vityaz Podolsk players
FC Rubin Kazan players
FC Volga Nizhny Novgorod players
FC Zenit Saint Petersburg players
FC Zenit-2 Saint Petersburg players
FC Dynamo Saint Petersburg players
FK Spartaks Jūrmala players
FC Shakhtyor Soligorsk players
FK Ventspils players
FC Akzhayik players
FC Kyzylzhar players
Russian Premier League players
Russian Second League players
Latvian Higher League players
Belarusian Premier League players
Kazakhstan Premier League players
Russian expatriate footballers
Expatriate footballers in Latvia
Expatriate footballers in Belarus
Expatriate footballers in Kazakhstan